Cychropsis wittmeriana is a species of ground beetle in the subfamily of Carabinae. It was described by Deuve in 1983.

References

wittmeriana
Beetles described in 1983